Grandad Bluff (also Granddad Bluff) is a bluff on the east side of La Crosse, Wisconsin. Bliss Road provides access to the bluff.

A park shelter in a fenced-off area atop the bluff provides visitors with a view of La Crosse. It contains a panoramic photo of La Crosse taken in 2004, with annotations of La Crosse landmarks. Locations visible from the bluff include the University of Wisconsin–La Crosse, the Mississippi River, bluffs in Minnesota, and Interstate 90.

Geology

The landscape has a geomorphically young appearance because of its Pleistocene history. The Mississippi River probably did not occupy this course before the Pleistocene. The bluffs along this portion of the Mississippi River consist of dolomite of the Prairie du Chien Group capping Cambrian sandstone. Grandad Bluff is a classic mesa, as are all the bluffs along the river.

History
The land comprising much of Grandad Bluff was first purchased from the state by Judge George Gale in July 1851. Between 1851 and 1912, there were 83 transfers of the property. The bluff was used as a source of construction materials, and its limestone was quarried for many years. The bluff was to be sold for large-scale quarrying, however the La Crosse residents were outraged by the plans. To save the bluff from ruin, Ellen Hixon and her son Joseph, a prominent La Crosse family, purchased the land in 1909. The family held the property in trust until 1912 when the land was donated as a park to the city of La Crosse. A group of residents, led by Ellen Hixon, raised $15,000 to construct roads and purchase more land around the bluff. The area below Grandad Bluff became the center of Hixon Forest, which continues to serve as a popular hiking area.

In 1928 there was a movement to change the name of the bluff to Granddad Mountain, and to name the series of bluffs along the Mississippi River "The Mississippi Mountain Range".

A shelter was constructed in Grandad Bluff Park in 1938 by the Works Progress Administration using stone quarried from the south side of the bluff. In 1941, a  flagpole was erected by the La Crosse chapter of Reserve Officers Association using money raised by schoolchildren. Eleven years later, in 1952, a rustic split rail fence of native oak was constructed, along with two new picnic areas with parking. The shelter was wired with electricity in 1954, and public restrooms were constructed about ten years later. A new pump house was built in 1976. Landscaping projects were completed during the 1980s, and a new  flagpole was erected by the La Crosse Jaycees in 1994.

Since 1929, the La Crosse Skyrockers organization has conducted a fireworks show from atop Grandad Bluff at midnight on New Year's Eve. The show is patterned after the New Year's fireworks show that takes place over Pikes Peak in Colorado.

References

External links
 City of Lacrosse Parks Department page on Grandad Park 
 Articles about Grandad Bluff, La Crosse Public Library, La Crosse, Wisconsin
 Photos of Grandad Bluff
 Topographical Map of Grandad Bluff

Landforms of La Crosse County, Wisconsin
La Crosse, Wisconsin
Driftless Area
Parks in Wisconsin
Protected areas of La Crosse County, Wisconsin
Mesas of the United States
Works Progress Administration in Wisconsin